Betty's Bay is a small holiday town situated on the Overberg coast of South Africa's Western Cape province. It is located 100 km from Cape Town beneath the Kogelberg Mountains on the scenic R44 ocean drive between Pringle Bay and Kleinmond. This village stretches over 13 km along the coast. Tourism plays a large role in the town's economy due to its popularity with holiday makers from across the Western Cape and Cape Town in particular.

During colonial times Betty's Bay was allegedly a favourite place for runaway slaves, and in 1912 Betty's Bay became a formal whaling station running up until the 1930s. Remains of the whaling station can still be seen at Stony Point.

Bettys Bay is named after Betty Youlden, daughter of the first developer of the area Arthur Youlden. 

Betty's Bay contains the Harold Porter National Botanical Garden as well as an African penguin colony in the Betty's Bay Marine Protected Area, which is one of the two Penguin colonies in the area of the Western Cape. The colony is situated in the Kogelberg and Stony Point Nature Reserve. When the former whaling station was closed, the endemic and endangered Southern African penguins started breeding here.

Geography 
Due to the town's location on the south-western coast and surrounding mountainous geography it receives near constant wind and ample rain throughout the year, With south-easterly winds bringing the occasional thunderstorm from the warmer eastern coast, and frontal rain from the west in winter which can be very heavy at times.

Betty's Bay has a marine west coast oceanic climate (Köppen Cfb) which sees pleasant warm temperatures in summer, and mild to cool temperatures in winter with rain throughout the year.

References 

Whaling in South Africa
Betty's Bay
Articles containing video clips
Bays of South Africa